The Massachusetts Charter School Expansion Initiative, Question 2 was an unsuccessful initiative voted on in the Massachusetts general election held on November 8, 2016. It was one of four 2016 ballot measures put to public vote.

Voting
Question 2 on the ballot, "Charter School Expansion".

 A "yes" vote would give the Massachusetts Department of Elementary and Secondary Education the authority to lift the cap and allow up to 12 new charter schools or to expand existing charter schools each year.
 A "no" vote would leave the current cap in place.

Source:

If the ballot measure had been approved, the proposed law would have taken effect on January 1, 2017.

References

Further reading

External links
 2016 Ballot Questions at sec.state.ma.us

Public education in Massachusetts
2016 Massachusetts ballot measures
Initiatives in the United States